The 1999 Australian Touring Car season was the 40th year of touring car racing in Australia since the first runnings of the Australian Touring Car Championship and the fore-runner of the present day Bathurst 1000, the Armstrong 500.

Two major touring car categories raced in Australia during 1999, V8 Supercar and Super Touring. Between them there were 25 touring car race meetings held during 1999; a thirteen-round series for V8 Supercars, the 1999 Shell Championship Series (SCS), two of them endurance races; an eight-round series for Super Touring, the 1999 Australian Super Touring Championship (ASTC); support programme events at the 1999 Australian Grand Prix and 1999 Honda Indy 300 and two stand-alone long distance races, nicknamed 'enduros'.

Results and Standings

Race Calendar
The 1999 Australian touring car season consisted of 25 events.

Hot Wheels V8 Supercar Showdown
This meeting was a support event of the 1999 Australian Grand Prix.

Shell Championship Series

Australian Super Touring Championship

Bob Jane T-Marts V8 300

Bob Jane T-Marts 500

V8 Supercar Challenge
This meeting was a support event of the 1999 Honda Indy 300.

References

Additional references can be found in linked event/series reports.

External links
 Official V8 Supercar site
 1999 Racing Results Archive

Touring Cars
 
Supercar seasons